Hung Tso Tin Tsuen is a village in the Shap Pat Heung area of Yuen Long District, Hong Kong.

Administration
Hung Tso Tin Tsuen is a recognized village under the New Territories Small House Policy.

References

External links

 Delineation of area of existing village Hung Cho Tin (Shap Pat Heung) for election of resident representative (2019 to 2022)

Villages in Yuen Long District, Hong Kong
Shap Pat Heung